"A Short Drink from a Certain Fountain" is an episode of the American television anthology series The Twilight Zone. In this episode, a scientist gives his brother an experimental youth serum in order to save his marriage to a much younger woman. The episode's title refers to the mythical Fountain of Youth.

Opening narration

Plot
Harmon Gordon, a wealthy old man married to a much younger woman named Flora, is exhausted by his wife's youthful and selfish lifestyle. Seeking to keep up the pace, he asks his scientist brother Raymond to inject him with an experimental youth serum. Raymond firmly refuses at first, saying that the serum has had mixed results even in laboratory animals and won't be ready for testing on humans without decades of refining. Moreover, he abhors Flora for her callous treatment of his brother, and is not enthusiastic about any step to strengthen their marriage. However, when Harmon suggests he will commit suicide rather than lose Flora, his brother reluctantly agrees to administer the serum.

At his brother's instructions, Harmon rests after taking the serum. He wakens to find himself a young man, to Flora's surprised delight. However, before Harmon can enjoy his new youth, the regression continues, and hours later he has become a toddler. Flora tries to leave, but Raymond insists she must stay and raise the infant Harmon or be cut off from Harmon's fortune. He threatens to take legal action against her if she abandons the child. Finding a stroke of poetic justice in what has happened, Raymond points out that by the time Harmon has regained adulthood, his position with Flora will be reversed, with Flora being old. When she bemoans the fact that everything is now on Harmon's side, Raymond shrugs, "Well, you see, Flora? As you get older, see how wise you get?"

Closing narration

Production
Initially, the Raymond Gordon character was to be a typical family physician. Disturbed by the character's willingness to experiment on a fellow human (Harmon, his brother), CBS asked that his occupation be changed to that of a research scientist. Serling complied.

The opening narration uses an allusion to the respected poet Henry Thoreau, a poet, essayist, and philosopher who spoke extensively on aging, maturity, and romantic themes—all of which feature extensively in the narrative.

This episode (because of a lawsuit filed by someone claiming they had the idea for the story first) was not included in the Twilight Zone syndication package until 1984. When this and other long unseen episodes became available (including "Miniature"), a series of short introductions were shot featuring commentary from the cast and crew of the original episodes. In the segment with Patrick O'Neal for this episode, O'Neal remarked on how accurately the show's makeup effects artists had aged him, as he now very closely resembled his older appearance in this episode. O'Neal was only eight years older than Ruta Lee, who played the much younger Flora.

References

Sources
DeVoe, Bill. (2008). Trivia from The Twilight Zone. Albany, GA: Bear Manor Media. 
Grams, Martin. (2008). The Twilight Zone: Unlocking the Door to a Television Classic. Churchville, MD: OTR Publishing. 
Zicree, Marc Scott: The Twilight Zone Companion.  Sillman-James Press, 1982 (second edition)

External links

1963 American television episodes
The Twilight Zone (1959 TV series season 5) episodes
Works about old age
Romantic fantasy television series
Television episodes written by Rod Serling